Woodbury Creek is a stream in Freeborn and Mower Counties in the U.S. state of Minnesota.

Woodbury Creek was named after an early settler.

See also
List of rivers of Minnesota

References

Rivers of Freeborn County, Minnesota
Rivers of Mower County, Minnesota
Rivers of Minnesota